Anuvahood is a 2011 British urban comedy film directed by Adam Deacon, who also plays the film's lead character. It also stars Paul Kaye, Wil Johnson, Ollie Barbieri, Femi Oyeniran, Jocelyn Jee Esien, and Ashley Walters. Critics of the film received it negatively, although it had a strong box-office opening. The film released worldwide on 18 March 2011.

Anuvahood is a parody of films in the vein of urban films such as Kidulthood, Adulthood, and Shank, all of which Deacon starred in.

Plot
The story follows Kenneth (Adam Deacon) who likes to call himself "K". He has an ambition of becoming a grime MC, and has already created his debut mixtape, Feel The Pain. However, nobody has bought a single copy and Kenneth works, for now, at local supermarket Laimsbury's to help pay his family's rent. When his boss insults him at work for trying to be a rapper, he quits and his mother berates him for failing to pay the house rent and his family is soon threatened by bailiffs.

Kenneth cannot take seeing his mother hassled by the bailiffs, so he begins to sell illegal drugs with his friends Bookie (Femi Oyeniran), Enrique (Ollie Barbieri), Lesoi (Michael Vu), and TJ (Jazzie Zonzolo). When local badman Tyrone (Richie Campbell) investigates Kenneth, he steals Kenneth's and his friends' accessories. His friends leave him and his family do not support him, so Kenneth slyly breaks into Tyrone's house to steal back his stuff.

While Tyrone cheats on his baby's mother in the other room, Kenneth manages to steal everyone's stuff back, but Tyrone finds out and comes after him. Tyrone attacks him, and his friends try to help him, but Tyrone manages to scare them away, making it a one-on-one fight. Kenneth shockingly fights back and takes Tyrone down.

After the humiliation, Tyrone's boss arrives and witnesses Tyrone hitting kids, therefore sacks him and insults him in front of the entire hood. But to make matters worse, Tyrone's baby's mother's brother appears on the scene to punish him further for cheating on his sister, and Tyrone flees in humiliation.

Kenneth gets his job back at Laimsbury's and helps pay his family's rent.

Cast

 Adam Deacon as Kenneth "K" O'Sullivan-Fletcher
 Femi Oyeniran as Bookie
 Ollie Barbieri as Enrique Estaban De La Fuente
 Jazzie Zonzolo as T.J.
 Michael Vu as Lesoi
 Richie Campbell as Tyrone
 Jaime Winstone as Yasmin
 Paul Kaye as Tony
 Ashley Walters as Cracks
 Terry Stone as Terry
 Eddie Kadi as Tunde
 Perry Benson as Brian
 Linda Robson as Pauline
 Richard Blackwood as Russell
 Wil Johnson as Mike
 Jason Maza as Darren
 Carmell Roche as Kesha
 Jocelyn Jee Esien as Tasha
 Ashley Chin as Mo
 Michael Maris as Big T
 Alex Macqueen as Edward
 Doon Mackichan as Patricia
 Aisleyne Horgan-Wallace as Maria
 Levi Roots as Himself (special appearance during intro credits)
 Jahmek Power as Murkleman

References

External links
 
 Official site

2011 films
2010s crime comedy-drama films
2010s gang films
2010s parody films
Black British films
Black British cinema
Black British mass media
British crime comedy-drama films
British parody films
Films about drugs
Films set in London
Gateway Films films
Hood comedy films
2011 drama films
2010s English-language films
2010s American films
2010s British films